Robert Myers Jr. (born 1983) is an American politician serving as a member of the Alaska Senate for the B district, which includes North Pole and other parts of the Fairbanks North Star Borough.

Early life and education 
Born in Fairbanks, Alaska, Myers graduated from West Valley High School in Fairbanks and from the University of Alaska Fairbanks, where he earned a Bachelor of Arts degree in philosophy in 2007.

Career 
Myers briefly worked as an intern in the Alaska Legislature before becoming a truck driver and tour bus operator. In 2020, he successfully ran for state senate, defeating longtime incumbent John Coghill by 14 votes in the Republican primary election. He went on to defeat independents Marna Sanford and Evan Eads in the general election.

Myers describes himself as a conservative Republican.

Personal life 
Married to Dawna Myers, they have three children.

References 

1983 births
Republican Party Alaska state senators
Living people
People from North Pole, Alaska
21st-century American politicians